Damanab may refer to:
 Damanab, Ahar
 Damanab, Hashtrud